The 1980–81 NBA season was the Detroit Pistons' 33rd season in the NBA and 24th season in the city of Detroit.  The team played at the Pontiac Silverdome.

The rebuilding Pistons finished the season with a 21–61 (.256) record, 6th place in the Central Division.  The team was led by center Kent Benson (15.7 ppg, 6.8 rpg) and guard John Long (17.7 ppg).

Draft picks

Roster

Regular season

Season standings

z - clinched division title
y - clinched division title
x - clinched playoff spot

Record vs. opponents

Game log

Regular season

|- align="center" bgcolor="#ffcccc"
| 1
| October 10
| Washington
| L 85–95
|
|
|
| Pontiac Silverdome
| 0–1
|- align="center" bgcolor="#ffcccc"
| 2
| October 11
| @ Indiana
| L 87–100
|
|
|
| Market Square Arena
| 0–2
|- align="center" bgcolor="#ffcccc"
| 3
| October 13
| @ New Jersey
| L 92–108
|
|
|
| Rutgers Athletic Center
| 0–3
|- align="center" bgcolor="#ffcccc"
| 4
| October 14
| @ Cleveland
| L 91–99
|
|
|
| Richfield Coliseum
| 0–4
|- align="center" bgcolor="#ffcccc"
| 5
| October 16
| San Antonio
| L 99–102
|
|
|
| Pontiac Silverdome
| 0–5
|- align="center" bgcolor="#ffcccc"
| 6
| October 18
| Atlanta
| L 123–125 (2OT)
|
|
|
| Pontiac Silverdome
| 0–6
|- align="center" bgcolor="#ffcccc"
| 7
| October 22
| Philadelphia
| L 93–94
|
|
|
| Pontiac Silverdome
| 0–7
|- align="center" bgcolor="#ccffcc"
| 8
| October 25
| @ Houston
| W 112–109
|
|
|
| The Summit
| 1–7
|- align="center" bgcolor="#ffcccc"
| 9
| October 29
| Boston
| L 85–103
|
|
|
| Pontiac Silverdome
| 1–8
|- align="center" bgcolor="#ffcccc"
| 10
| October 31
| Phoenix
| L 98–103 (OT)
|
|
|
| Pontiac Silverdome
| 1–9

|- align="center" bgcolor="#ffcccc"
| 11
| November 1
| @ Chicago
| L 100–122
|
|
|
| Chicago Stadium
| 1–10
|- align="center" bgcolor="#ccffcc"
| 12
| November 4
| @ Milwaukee
| W 98–96
|
|
|
| MECCA Arena
| 2–10
|- align="center" bgcolor="#ffcccc"
| 13
| November 5
| @ Philadelphia
| L 103–107
|
|
|
| The Spectrum
| 2–11
|- align="center" bgcolor="#ffcccc"
| 14
| November 7
| @ Washington
| L 88–114
|
|
|
| Capital Centre
| 2–12
|- align="center" bgcolor="#ccffcc"
| 15
| November 8
| Dallas
| W 101–73
|
|
|
| Pontiac Silverdome
| 3–12
|- align="center" bgcolor="#ffcccc"
| 16
| November 11
| @ New York
| L 118–149
|
|
|
| Madison Square Garden
| 3–13
|- align="center" bgcolor="#ffcccc"
| 17
| November 12
| Milwaukee
| L 98–122
|
|
|
| Pontiac Silverdome
| 3–14
|- align="center" bgcolor="#ccffcc"
| 18
| November 14
| Chicago
| W 106–99
|
|
|
| Pontiac Silverdome
| 4–14
|- align="center" bgcolor="#ffcccc"
| 19
| November 16
| @ New Jersey
| L 80–89
|
|
|
| Rutgers Athletic Center
| 4–15
|- align="center" bgcolor="#ffcccc"
| 20
| November 18
| Indiana
| L 97–102
|
|
|
| Pontiac Silverdome
| 4–16
|- align="center" bgcolor="#ccffcc"
| 21
| November 20
| San Diego
| W 97–90
|
|
|
| Pontiac Silverdome
| 5–16
|- align="center" bgcolor="#ccffcc"
| 22
| November 22
| New Jersey
| W 117–103
|
|
|
| Pontiac Silverdome
| 6–16
|- align="center" bgcolor="#ffcccc"
| 23
| November 26
| Utah
| L 97–104
|
|
|
| Pontiac Silverdome
| 6–17
|- align="center" bgcolor="#ccffcc"
| 24
| November 28
| Kansas City
| W 104–94
|
|
|
| Pontiac Silverdome
| 7–17
|- align="center" bgcolor="#ccffcc"
| 25
| November 29
| @ Atlanta
| W 98–95
|
|
|
| The Omni
| 8–17

|- align="center" bgcolor="#ffcccc"
| 26
| December 2
| Boston
| L 85–94
|
|
|
| Pontiac Silverdome
| 8–18
|- align="center" bgcolor="#ffcccc"
| 27
| December 5
| @ Washington
| L 92–103
|
|
|
| Capital Centre
| 8–19
|- align="center" bgcolor="#ffcccc"
| 28
| December 6
| @ Cleveland
| L 100–101
|
|
|
| Richfield Coliseum
| 8–20
|- align="center" bgcolor="#ffcccc"
| 29
| December 10
| Atlanta
| L 92–100
|
|
|
| Pontiac Silverdome
| 8–21
|- align="center" bgcolor="#ccffcc"
| 30
| December 12
| Cleveland
| W 101–95
|
|
|
| Pontiac Silverdome
| 9–21
|- align="center" bgcolor="#ffcccc"
| 31
| December 13
| @ New York
| L 94–100
|
|
|
| Madison Square Garden
| 9–22
|- align="center" bgcolor="#ffcccc"
| 32
| December 17
| New York
| L 103–119
|
|
|
| Pontiac Silverdome
| 9–23
|- align="center" bgcolor="#ffcccc"
| 33
| December 18
| @ Milwaukee
| L 104–121
|
|
|
| MECCA Arena
| 9–24
|- align="center" bgcolor="#ccffcc"
| 34
| December 19
| Indiana
| W 109–106
|
|
|
| Pontiac Silverdome
| 10–24
|- align="center" bgcolor="#ffcccc"
| 35
| December 21
| @ San Diego
| L 97–117
|
|
|
| San Diego Sports Arena
| 10–25
|- align="center" bgcolor="#ffcccc"
| 36
| December 23
| @ Phoenix
| L 104–113
|
|
|
| Arizona Veterans Memorial Coliseum
| 10–26
|- align="center" bgcolor="#ffcccc"
| 37
| December 26
| Houston
| L 94–114
|
|
|
| Pontiac Silverdome
| 10–27
|- align="center" bgcolor="#ffcccc"
| 38
| December 27
| @ Chicago
| L 97–104
|
|
|
| Chicago Stadium
| 10–28
|- align="center" bgcolor="#ffcccc"
| 39
| December 30
| @ Atlanta
| L 89–96
|
|
|
| The Omni
| 10–29

|- align="center" bgcolor="#ccffcc"
| 40
| January 2
| New York
| W 102–100
|
|
|
| Pontiac Silverdome
| 11–29
|- align="center" bgcolor="#ffcccc"
| 41
| January 6
| @ Portland
| L 90–110
|
|
|
| Memorial Coliseum
| 11–30
|- align="center" bgcolor="#ffcccc"
| 42
| January 7
| @ Seattle
| L 94–99
|
|
|
| Kingdome
| 11–31
|- align="center" bgcolor="#ffcccc"
| 43
| January 10
| @ Golden State
| L 103–105
|
|
|
| Oakland–Alameda County Coliseum Arena
| 11–32
|- align="center" bgcolor="#ffcccc"
| 44
| January 11
| @ Los Angeles
| L 108–117
|
|
|
| The Forum
| 11–33
|- align="center" bgcolor="#ffcccc"
| 45
| January 13
| Milwaukee
| L 96–119
|
|
|
| Pontiac Silverdome
| 11–34
|- align="center" bgcolor="#ffcccc"
| 46
| January 14
| @ Indiana
| L 99–101
|
|
|
| Market Square Arena
| 11–35
|- align="center" bgcolor="#ffcccc"
| 47
| January 15
| Washington
| L 89–106
|
|
|
| Pontiac Silverdome
| 11–36
|- align="center" bgcolor="#ffcccc"
| 48
| January 17
| New Jersey
| L 103–119
|
|
|
| Pontiac Silverdome
| 11–37
|- align="center" bgcolor="#ffcccc"
| 49
| January 19
| @ Boston
| L 90–92
|
|
|
| Hartford Civic Center
| 11–38
|- align="center" bgcolor="#ccffcc"
| 50
| January 20
| Philadelphia
| W 83–75
|
|
|
| Pontiac Silverdome
| 12–38
|- align="center" bgcolor="#ffcccc"
| 51
| January 22
| Chicago
| L 92–125
|
|
|
| Pontiac Silverdome
| 12–39
|- align="center" bgcolor="#ccffcc"
| 52
| January 24
| Cleveland
| W 117–94
|
|
|
| Pontiac Silverdome
| 13–39
|- align="center" bgcolor="#ffcccc"
| 53
| January 26
| @ Utah
| L 99–102
|
|
|
| Salt Palace Acord Arena
| 13–40
|- align="center" bgcolor="#ffcccc"
| 54
| January 27
| @ Denver
| L 123–143
|
|
|
| McNichols Sports Arena
| 13–41
|- align="center" bgcolor="#ffcccc"
| 55
| January 29
| Golden State
| L 112–117
|
|
|
| Pontiac Silverdome
| 13–42

|- align="center" bgcolor="#ffcccc"
| 56
| February 3
| @ San Antonio
| L 99–102
|
|
|
| HemisFair Arena
| 13–43
|- align="center" bgcolor="#ffcccc"
| 57
| February 4
| @ Kansas City
| L 90–91
|
|
|
| Kemper Arena
| 13–44
|- align="center" bgcolor="#ffcccc"
| 58
| February 6
| Los Angeles
| L 102–111
|
|
|
| Pontiac Silverdome
| 13–45
|- align="center" bgcolor="#ffcccc"
| 59
| February 7
| @ Chicago
| L 90–98
|
|
|
| Chicago Stadium
| 13–46
|- align="center" bgcolor="#ffcccc"
| 60
| February 8
| Indiana
| L 101–124
|
|
|
| Pontiac Silverdome
| 13–47
|- align="center" bgcolor="#ccffcc"
| 61
| February 10
| @ Dallas
| W 101–95
|
|
|
| Reunion Arena
| 14–47
|- align="center" bgcolor="#ffcccc"
| 62
| February 13
| @ New York
| L 92–120
|
|
|
| Madison Square Garden
| 14–48
|- align="center" bgcolor="#ccffcc"
| 63
| February 14
| Washington
| W 105–103
|
|
|
| Pontiac Silverdome
| 15–48
|- align="center" bgcolor="#ffcccc"
| 64
| February 17
| @ Cleveland
| L 108–109
|
|
|
| Richfield Coliseum
| 15–49
|- align="center" bgcolor="#ffcccc"
| 65
| February 18
| @ Philadelphia
| L 97–111
|
|
|
| The Spectrum
| 15–50
|- align="center" bgcolor="#ffcccc"
| 66
| February 19
| Portland
| L 106–115
|
|
|
| Pontiac Silverdome
| 15–51
|- align="center" bgcolor="#ffcccc"
| 67
| February 21
| Boston
| L 119–130
|
|
|
| Pontiac Silverdome
| 15–52
|- align="center" bgcolor="#ccffcc"
| 68
| February 27
| Cleveland
| W 118–109
|
|
|
| Pontiac Silverdome
| 16–52

|- align="center" bgcolor="#ccffcc"
| 69
| March 1
| @ New Jersey
| W 117–104
|
|
|
| Rutgers Athletic Center
| 17–52
|- align="center" bgcolor="#ffcccc"
| 70
| March 3
| @ Milwaukee
| L 98–115
|
|
|
| MECCA Arena
| 17–53
|- align="center" bgcolor="#ffcccc"
| 71
| March 5
| New York
| L 101–104
|
|
|
| Pontiac Silverdome
| 17–54
|- align="center" bgcolor="#ffcccc"
| 72
| March 7
| Denver
| L 109–121
|
|
|
| Pontiac Silverdome
| 17–55
|- align="center" bgcolor="#ccffcc"
| 73
| March 11
| Atlanta
| W 100–97
|
|
|
| Pontiac Silverdome
| 18–55
|- align="center" bgcolor="#ffcccc"
| 73
| March 13
| Seattle
| L 100–102
|
|
|
| Pontiac Silverdome
| 18–56
|- align="center" bgcolor="#ccffcc"
| 75
| March 14
| @ Indiana
| W 101–94
|
|
|
| Market Square Arena
| 19–56
|- align="center" bgcolor="#ccffcc"
| 76
| March 18
| New Jersey
| W 118–115
|
|
|
| Pontiac Silverdome
| 20–56
|- align="center" bgcolor="#ffcccc"
| 77
| March 20
| Milwaukee
| L 86–104
|
|
|
| Pontiac Silverdome
| 20–57
|- align="center" bgcolor="#ffcccc"
| 78
| March 22
| Chicago
| L 103–109
|
|
|
| Pontiac Silverdome
| 20–58
|- align="center" bgcolor="#ffcccc"
| 79
| March 24
| @ Atlanta
| L 91–96
|
|
|
| The Omni
| 20–59
|- align="center" bgcolor="#ffcccc"
| 80
| March 25
| @ Philadelphia
| L 75–114
|
|
|
| The Spectrum
| 20–60
|- align="center" bgcolor="#ccffcc"
| 81
| March 27
| @ Boston
| W 115–90
|
|
|
| Boston Garden
| 21–60
|- align="center" bgcolor="#ffcccc"
| 82
| March 28
| @ Washington
| L 103–108
|
|
|
| Capital Centre
| 21–61

See also
1980–81 NBA season

References

Detroit Pistons seasons
De
Detroit Pistons
Detroit Pistons